Renegade Air  is a regional airline based at Wilson Airport in Nairobi, Kenya. Renegade Air was founded in 2012. It now serves the market between Wilson Airport, Wajir Airport and Kisumu International Airport, using Bombardier Dash 8-Q300 aircraft along these routes. Aside from scheduled passenger services they offer private charters, ACMI Leasing, Evacuation and Relief services. They operate a fleet of DASH 8 Q300, DASH 8 Q200, Cessna Caravan, Fokker 50 & Fokker 70.

References 

Airlines_of_Kenya
Airlines_established_in_2012
2012_establishments_in_Kenya